Shidaiqu is a type of Chinese popular music that is a fusion of Chinese folk, American jazz and Hollywood film music that originated in Shanghai, China in the 1920s.

Terminology
The term shídàiqǔ literally means "songs of the era" in Mandarin. When sung in Cantonese, it is referred to as (Jyut Jyu Si Doi Kuk). The term shidaiqu is thought to have been coined in Hong Kong to describe popular Chinese music that first emerged in Shanghai.

Musicality
Shidaiqu is a kind of fusion music that makes use of jazz musical instruments (castanets, maracas). Songs were sung in a high-pitched childlike style. This early style would soon be replaced by more sophisticated performances from better-trained singers. The songs of the period often use the ABA or ABCA form, which were new to Chinese audiences and are still used by modern composers. Melodies were simple and the songs are still sung today, such as "Wishing You Happiness and Prosperity" (恭喜恭喜) performed by Yao Lee and Yao Min.

History

Shidaiqu music is rooted in both traditional Chinese folk music and the introduction of Western jazz during the years when Shanghai was under the Shanghai International Settlement. In the 1920s the intellectual elite in Shanghai and Beijing embraced the influx of Western music and movies that entered through trade. The first jazz clubs in Shanghai initially targeted the Western elite, saw an influx of musicians, and acted as dance halls. Beginning in the 1920s, Shidaiqu entered into the mainstream of popular music. The Chinese pop song "Drizzle" ("毛毛雨") was composed by Li Jinhui around 1927 and sung by his daughter Li Minghui (黎明暉).  The song exemplifies the early shidaiqu in its fusion of jazz and Chinese folk music – the tune is in the style of a traditional pentatonic folk melody, but the instrumentation is similar to that of an American jazz orchestra.

The recording methods of songs on 78rpm gramophone shellac records marked a new age in Chinese musical history. Usually, the recording would be done in one take only. Therefore, sound engineers had to be extremely careful when making records. Steel stylus records (鋼針唱片), which were an important recording medium, have now been abandoned due to the development in digital recording.

Shanghai shidaiqu songs are sung in Mandarin, regarded as a symbol of fashion and progressive culture. A large part of the audience would not be fluent in Mandarin. Shanghai dominated the Chinese movie industry in the 1930s. Song of the Fishermen, a famous movie in the 1930s, marked the beginning of song films or musicals (歌舞片). Pop singers such as Zhou Xuan, Bai Guang, and Gong Qiuxia among others also participated in these films.

Mainstream
Shidaiqu reached peak popularity during 1940s. Famous jazz musicians from both the US and China played to packed dance halls. Chinese women singers grew in celebrity. Additionally, nightclubs such as the Paramount Dance Hall became a meeting point for businessmen from Western countries and China would meet. The western jazz influences were shaped predominately by American jazz musician Buck Clayton. Nowadays, shidaiqu has inspired Gary Lucas for his album The Edge of Heaven and DJs such as Ian Widgery and his Shanghai Lounge Divas project. On the other hand, if cinema was the origin of many songs, Wong Kar-wai used them again for illustrating his movie "In the Mood for Love"; Rebecca Pan, one of the actresses in this film, was also one of those famous shidaiqu singers.

Political connotations 
Shanghai was divided into the International Concession and the French Concession in the 1930s and early 1940s. Owing to the protection of foreign nations (e.g., Britain and France), Shanghai was a prosperous and a rather politically stable city. Some shidaiqu songs are related to particular historical events (e.g., the Second Sino-Japanese War). The euphemism of presenting love, which was always found in old Chinese novels, is kept in shidaiqu.

Decline
Throughout the decades leading up to the Great Leap Forward, the reputation of Shidaiqu outside of its target audience was degrading. Despite some of the songs intended to nation build, the government deemed Shidaiqu as "yellow music" and described it as "pornographic and commercial". In 1952 the Chinese Communist Party banned nightclubs and pop music production. During this time period, western-style instruments were sought out and destroyed. Chinese jazz musicians were not rehabilitated until decades later. The tradition then moved to Hong Kong and reached its height from the 1950s to the late 1960s, when it was replaced by Taiwanese pop (sung in Mandarin) and later Cantopop (Cantonese popular music). While it is considered a prototype, music enthusiasts may see it as an early version of Mandopop (Mandarin popular music).

Revival
While the tradition continued to thrive in Taiwan and Hong Kong, Shidaiqu gained popularity in mainland China once more during the 1980s. Shanghai opened up for the first time after WWII and interest in what used to be forbidden music peaked. Surviving musicians were invited to play once more in hotel lobbies and pop musicians began writing covers of famous songs such as Teresa Teng's 1978 cover of Li Xianglan's The Evening Primrose. In more recent years, a group called the Shanghai Restoration Project uses both the 1980s and 1940s pop songs to create electronic music.

Representatives

See also
C-pop
Seven Great Singing Stars
Music of China
Music of Hong Kong

Notes

References 
 https://web.archive.org/web/20160303193054/http://hoydenish.multiply.com/tag/shidaiqu/
 http://www.ne.jp/asahi/bai-dai/tokyo/menue.htm

Chinese styles of music
C-pop
Pop music genres